The 1956 New York Yankees season was the 54th season for the team. The team finished with a record of 97–57, winning their 22nd pennant, finishing 9 games ahead of the Cleveland Indians. New York was managed by Casey Stengel. The Yankees played their home games at Yankee Stadium. In the World Series, they defeated the Brooklyn Dodgers in 7 games. The Series featured the first no-hitter in Series play and only World Series perfect game, delivered by the Yankees' Don Larsen in Game 5.

Offseason
 February 8, 1956: Lou Berberet, Bob Wiesler, Herb Plews, Dick Tettelbach, and a player to be named later were traded by the Yankees to the Washington Senators for Mickey McDermott and Bobby Kline. The Yankees completed the deal by sending Whitey Herzog to the Senators on April 2.

Regular season
 April 17, 1956: Opening Day at Washington D.C.,. With president Dwight D. Eisenhower in attendance, Mickey Mantle began his triple crown year with two mammoth home runs in a 10-4 Yankees win over The Senators.
 April 18, 1956: Umpire Eddie Rommel was the first umpire to wear glasses in a major league game. The game was played between the Yankees and the Washington Senators.
 September 18, 1956: In a historic day for the Yankees. Mickey Mantle hit a game winning home run in the 11th inning to give the Yankees a 3-2 win over The Chicago White Sox in Chicago. It was Mickey's 50th homer this season becoming the first Yankee since Babe Ruth in 1928 to hit 50 home runs in a season. This win also clinched the Yankees as American League Champions.

Season standings

Record vs. opponents

Notable transactions
 May 28, 1956: Gerry Staley was selected off waivers from the Yankees by the Chicago White Sox.
 June 14, 1956: Lou Skizas and Eddie Robinson were traded by the Yankees to the Kansas City Athletics for Moe Burtschy, Bill Renna and cash.
 July 11, 1956: Wally Burnette was traded by the Yankees to the Kansas City Athletics for Tommy Lasorda.
 August 25, 1956: Enos Slaughter was selected off waivers by the Yankees from the Kansas City Athletics.

Roster

Player stats

Batting

Starters by position
Note: Pos = Position; G = Games played; AB = At bats; H = Hits; Avg. = Batting average; HR = Home runs; RBI = Runs batted in

Other batters
Note: G = Games played; AB = At bats; H = Hits; Avg. = Batting average; HR = Home runs; RBI = Runs batted in

Pitching

Starting pitchers
Note: G = Games pitched; IP = Innings pitched; W = Wins; L = Losses; ERA = Earned run average; SO = Strikeouts

Other pitchers
Note: G = Games pitched; IP = Innings pitched; W = Wins; L = Losses; ERA = Earned run average; SO = Strikeouts

Relief pitchers
Note: G = Games pitched; W = Wins; L = Losses; SV = Saves; ERA = Earned run average; SO = Strikeouts

1956 World Series 

AL New York Yankees (4) vs. NL Brooklyn Dodgers (3)

Awards and honors
 Don Larsen, Babe Ruth Award
 Mickey Mantle, American League MVP
 Mickey Mantle, Associated Press Athlete of the Year
All-Star Game

Farm system

Bradford club folded, May 18, 1956

Notes

References
1956 New York Yankees at Baseball Reference
1956 World Series
1956 New York Yankees at Baseball Almanac

New York Yankees seasons
New York Yankees season
New York Yankees
1950s in the Bronx
American League champion seasons
World Series champion seasons